Abel Kanyamuna (born 10 June 2002) is a Zambian footballer who plays as a midfielder for Trofense.

Career

As a youth player, Kanyamuna joined the youth academy of Italian third division side Pistoiese, becoming the first Zambian to play in Italy. After that, he joined the youth academy of Italian Serie A club Cagliari. Before the second half of 2020–21, he signed for Trofense in the Portuguese third division. On 14 March 2021, Kanyamuna debuted for Trofense during a 1-0 win over Amarante.

References

External links
 

Zambian footballers
Living people
Expatriate footballers in Portugal
2002 births
Association football midfielders
C.D. Trofense players
Liga Portugal 2 players
Campeonato de Portugal (league) players
Expatriate footballers in Italy